Space folding may refer to:

 Folding (chemistry), the three-dimensional arrangement of complex organic polymers, such as proteins
 Space folding (science fiction), a fictitious method of faster-than-light travel whereby the space-time continuum is "folded"
 Space folding (Dune), the specific portrayal of faster-than-light travel in Frank Herbert's Dune series
 Spacetime curvature due to gravity, a central aspect of the general theory of relativity
 Space-time folding, a physical concept of non-flat spacetime, related to wormholes.